Prenton Brook is a tributary of the River Fender, in Wirral, Merseyside. The brook starts as  field drainage east of Thingwall and flows through Barnston Dale. Prenton Brook joins the River Fender at Prenton. The River Fender then joins the Birket at Leasowe. The Birket discharges into the West Float at the site of the former Wallasey Pool, which itself discharges into the River Mersey.

References

Prenton Brook
3Prenton